The Church of Saint Elijah the Prophet ( / Crkva Svetog Ilije Proroka) is the Serbian Orthodox church in Coober Pedy, South Australia, built in 1993 and is dedicated to Saint Elijah. It belongs to the Serbian Orthodox Eparchy of Australia and New Zealand. The church is a popular tourist attraction because of its underground location. The whole church complex, with a church, a community hall, a parish house and a religious school, is carved in the sandstone between 3 and 17 metres under the ground level.

The building
The church was built by Serbian Australians who settled in Coober Pedy as opal miners. Because of the hot climate, it was decided to build a church under the ground. The digging of the community hall begun in June 1992, and was finished in a month. The digging of the church itself began in February 1993, and was finished in August 1993, and consecrated on the St Elijah's day. All work was done by the volunteers. The ceiling window is covered with stained glass. The floor is  under the ground level in the deepest point, and  under the ground level at the shallowest point. The church has a gallery with a baptismal font and the altar. The iconostasis is made of glass. The interior walls are covered with bas reliefs of saints carved in stone. The whole complex contains the church, the community hall, priest's home and the religious school, all carved under the ground.

Today, the church is a tourist attraction. More tourists visit the church than there are parishioners. The entrance fee is 5 AUD for tourists.

References

Churches in South Australia
Serbian Orthodox church buildings in Australia
Cave churches
1993 establishments in Australia
Far North (South Australia)